Lamb County is a county located in the U.S. state of Texas. As of the 2020 census, its population was 13,045. Its county seat is Littlefield. The county was created in 1876, but not organized until 1908. It is named for George A. Lamb, who died in the Battle of San Jacinto.

Lamb County was the home of the Texas House Speaker Bill W. Clayton, who served from 1975 until 1983.  It is also the birthplace of country music singer Waylon Jennings.

History
Lamb County was formed in 1876 from portions of Bexar County. It was named after George A. Lamb, a soldier in the Battle of San Jacinto.

In the 1960s the water table began to decline. From the 1980s until 2023, the population declined by about 33%. Between circa 2013 and 2023, the population declined by about 8%.

During the COVID-19 pandemic in Texas, Lamb County had an almost 1/100 death rate as of March 2023. As of that month, Lamb County, among American counties with 2,500 or more residents, had the eighth highest COVID-19 death rate.

By 2023 there was water scarcity among farms, and many younger people moved to other counties for lobs.

Geography

Adjacent counties
 Castro County (north)
 Hale County (east)
 Hockley County (south)
 Bailey County (west)
 Parmer County (northwest)
 Lubbock County (southeast)
 Cochran County (southwest)

Demographics

Note: the US Census treats Hispanic/Latino as an ethnic category. This table excludes Latinos from the racial categories and assigns them to a separate category. Hispanics/Latinos can be of any race.

As of the census of 2000, 14,709 people, 5,360 households, and 3,991 families resided in the county.  The population density was 14 people per square mile (6/km2).  The 6,294 housing units averaged 6 per square mile (2/km2).  The racial makeup of the county was 76.1% White, 4.3% Black or African American, 0.7% Native American, 0.1% Asian, less than 0.05% Pacific Islander, 16.9% from other races, and 1.9% from two or more races. About 43.5% of the population was Hispanic or Latino of any race.

Of the 5,360 households, 35.4% had children under 18 living with them, 59.5% were married couples living together, 10.2% had a female householder with no husband present, and 25.5% were not families. About 23.7% of all households were made up of individuals, and 12.8% had someone living alone who was 65 years of age or older.  The average household size was 2.69 and the average family size was 3.19.

In the county, the population was distributed as 29.6% under 18, 8.1% from 18 to 24, 24.2% from 25 to 44, 20.8% from 45 to 64, and 17.3% who were 65 age or older.  The median age was 36 years. For every 100 females, there were 94.2 males.  For every 100 females age 18 and over, there were 89.9 males.

The median income for a household in the county was $36,898, and for a family was $31,833. Males had a median income of $36,434 versus $30,342 for females. The per capita income for the county was $30,169.  About 18.0% of families and 10.9% of the population were below the poverty line, including 27.3% of those under age 18 and 15.3% of those age 65 or over.

Transportation

Major highways
  U.S. Highway 70
  U.S. Highway 84
  U.S. Highway 385

Airports
Littlefield Municipal Airport is located in Lamb County, 3 nautical miles (6 km) west of the central business district of Littlefield, Texas.

Communities

Cities
 Amherst
 Earth
 Littlefield (county seat)
 Olton
 Sudan

Town
 Springlake

Census-designated place
 Spade

Unincorporated community
 Fieldton

Education
School districts serving the county include:
 Amherst Independent School District
 Anton Independent School District
 Littlefield Independent School District
 Muleshoe Independent School District
 Olton Independent School District
 Springlake-Earth Independent School District
 Sudan Independent School District
 Whiteface Consolidated Independent School District

The county is in the service area of South Plains College.

Media
 there is one newspaper, Lamb County Leader-News, with three employees. An additional employee had died of COVID-19 in 2022, and the newspaper did not hire another individual.

The Olton Enterprise, another newspaper, stopped publication in 2021.

In 2023 Alejandro de la Garza wrote, in regards to the media landscape during the COVID-19 pandemic as the pandemic had caused damage to local media outlets, "for many residents, their Facebook feeds took the place of local media."

Gallery

Politics

In the 2020 U.S. presidential election, about 80% of the county's residents selected Donald Trump.

Healthcare
In August 22, 43% of the county's residents had completed at least one COVID-19 vaccination series.

See also

 Recorded Texas Historic Landmarks in Lamb County
 Dry counties
 Plant X
 Llano Estacado
 West Texas

References

External links
 
 Lamb County Profile from the Texas Association of Counties

 
1908 establishments in Texas
Populated places established in 1908
Majority-minority counties in Texas